Nora Owen (born 1 June 1945) is an Irish former Fine Gael politician who served as Minister for Justice from 1994 to 1997 and Deputy Leader of Fine Gael from 1993 to 2001. She served as a Teachta Dála (TD) for the Dublin North constituency from 1981 to 1987 and 1989 to 2002.

She was a presenter of TV3's topical programme Midweek.

Early life
Owen was born in Dublin in 1945. She is a sister of Mary Banotti and a grandniece of the Irish revolutionary leader Michael Collins. She was educated at Dominican Convent, County Wicklow and University College Dublin (UCD) where she qualified as an industrial chemist.

Political career
Owen was first elected to Dublin County Council in 1979 for the Malahide local electoral area. She was later elected as a Fine Gael TD for the first time in 1981, serving until the 1987 election when she lost her seat. That year she became a member of the executive of Trócaire. She returned to Dáil Éireann following the 1989 general election. In 1993, she became Deputy Leader of Fine Gael. The following year she became Minister for Justice, remaining in that post until 1997. She undertook a significant programme of criminal law reform. Among the major changes she implemented was the referendum on bail in 1996, leading to the Bail Act,1997, which allows a court to refuse bail to those charged with a serious offence where it is considered necessary to prevent them committing a serious offence. Journalist Veronica Guerin was murdered in 1996 and in its aftermath Owen introduced the highly successful Criminal Assets Bureau to crack down on organised crime. In 2002, she became the first high-profile Fine Gael TD to lose her seat in Dublin North in the party's disastrous general election result.

Post-political life
Owen is the patron of the Collins 22 Society, which works to keep the memory and legacy of Michael Collins in living memory. She occasionally works as an election pundit. In August 2011, it was announced she was to present the Irish version of Mastermind on TV3. In February 2012, she was made a Vice President of the Railway Preservation Society of Ireland.

References

External links
Michael Collins 22 Society webpage

 

1945 births
Living people
Alumni of University College Dublin
Nora
Councillors of Dublin County Council
Female justice ministers
Fine Gael TDs
Members of the 22nd Dáil
Members of the 23rd Dáil
Members of the 24th Dáil
Members of the 26th Dáil
Members of the 27th Dáil
Members of the 28th Dáil
20th-century women Teachtaí Dála
21st-century women Teachtaí Dála
Ministers for Justice (Ireland)
Politicians from County Dublin
Virgin Media Television (Ireland) presenters
Women government ministers of the Republic of Ireland
People from Malahide